Rajbari Government College is a public college situated in Rajbari, Bangladesh established in 1961. It is one of the traditional and largest educational institutions in Rajbari district. The foundation stone of the college was laid on 23 June 1961. It was nationalised in 1980.

History 
The then Rajbari District was identified as a neglected underdeveloped area and there was no higher educational institution to meet people's demand for higher education. Many students had to go to Government Rajendra College, Faridpur, Kushtia Government College, Government Debendra College and other distant colleges of the country. The matter stirred the minds of the people of the area. In this regard, Kazi Hedayet Hossain, Dr. AKM Aszad, Dr. SM Yahya, Amalkrishna Chakraborty, Vrindavan Das, Fazlul Haque Muktar, Advocate Abul Kashem Mridha, Advocate Abdul Jalil Mia, Dr. Jalilur Rahman, Margub Ahmed, Dr. Azahar Uddin, AH Hanif Mollah (Goalund) took initiative to establish colleges especially at the local level.

Meanwhile, Kazi Azhar Ali became the Subdivisional Officer of Goalund. He came forward with huge initiative to establishing the college. Then it was a difficult matter to get approval for the establishment of the college because of constraints of money, property, and interested students. Nevertheless, Kazi Azhar Ali came forward with local enthusiasts to establishing the college. A committee was formed for this purpose. The committee was chaired by Kazi Azhar Ali, Secretary Mamunur Rashid (Second Officer) and Joint Secretary AKM Aszad. Members were Kazi Hedayet Hossain, Advocate Abdul Jalil Mia, Advocate Abu Hena, Fazlul Muktar.

Half a kilometer west of Rajbari railway station, the 100-year-old  two storeyed building of the Baptist Mission, with 48 decimal (0.48 acre) land, was registered by Shimshan Chowdhury Ataikola on behalf of the Baptist Mission and handed over to the Governing Body. Later, the land of the present college stood at 14 acres by means of purchase and donation of many generous in the vicinity. The foundation stone was laid in 1961 by the then Governor of East Pakistan, Azam Khan. The college was inaugurated on 23 June 1961 by the then Sub-Divisional Officer Kazi Azahar Ali. In the first year, the tin house in front of the present library was used for classes, and the present principal's room and office building were the principal's room and office room.

The Departments of Humanities and Commerce were opened in 1981 and the Departments of Science in 1982.

Classes were not constructed till 1964 and due to increasing student pressure, classes were taken in the present district school (then Goyland Model High School) in 1973. The present Sajjan Kanda (next to Kazi Bari) at the time of establishment of the college. Accepted by the administration as the home for the principal. Osman Gani, a retired registrar of Rajshahi University, was appointed as the principal.

Academics 
Rajbari Government College offers Higher Secondary School Certificate (HSC), four year Honours, and one year Master's courses in various disciplines. Currently about 11000 students are enrolled in the college. Number of teachers is 72.

HSC level 
 Science
 Business Studies
 Humanities

Honours and Masters level 
 Department of Accounting
 Department of Bengali
 Department of Botany
 Department of Chemistry
 Department of Economics
 Department of English
 Department of History
 Department of Islamic History and Culture
 Department of Management
 Department of Mathematics
 Department of Philosophy
 Department of Political Science
 Department of Physics
 Department of Sociology
 Department of Zoology

Notable alumni
 Chanchal Chowdhury, Actor, two-times National Film Awards winner.
 Kazi Keramat Ali, MP, Bangladesh and former State Minister for Technical and Madrasa Education.

References

Colleges in Dhaka District
Rajbari District
1961 establishments in East Pakistan